BSL may refer to:

Business 
Boyne Smelters Limited, an Australian-based aluminium smelter company
Black Star Line, a former shipping line owned by Marcus Garvey
Brookdale Senior Living, a U.S. company that operates senior residences
BlueScope Steel Limited, an Australian-based flat product steel producer

Education 
Bachelor of Science in Law, an academic degree
The British School of Lome, a school in Togo, West Africa
Transport Phenomena (book), an engineering textbook also known by its authors' initials (Bird, Stewart, and Lightfoot)
Bangladesh Chhatra League, a students' political organisation in Bangladesh

Linguistics 

British Sign Language
Bhutanese Sign Language

Science and computing 
Biosafety level, also referred to as Biohazard Safety Level
Boost Software License, a license popular for C++ projects
The Bulletin of Symbolic Logic from the Association for Symbolic Logic
Bootstrap loader, the full term for the software involved in booting a computer

Sports 
Basketball Super League (Turkish: Basketbol Süper Ligi), Turkey's premier men's basketball league
Israeli Basketball Super League, a former name of Israel's premier men's basketball league, now the Israeli Basketball Premier League
Bafakhy Super League

Transportation 
EuroAirport Basel Mulhouse Freiburg, by IATA airport code
Broad Street Line, a subway line in Philadelphia, Pennsylvania

Other uses 
Biologic Space Laboratories, the location of the Metroid Fusion video game
Beam Stage Loader, a machine that forms part of a longwall mine
Blood sugar level
 Breed-specific legislation, a law to prohibit or restrict the keeping of particular types of dog